The FIA WTCR Race of Italy is a round of the World Touring Car Championship that has taken place in Italy. It will be held at Vallelunga Circuit in 2022 season. In 2021, it was held at the extended version of Adria International Raceway. Before that, it was mostly held at the Autodromo Nazionale di Monza in Monza near Milan, Lombardy.

The Race of Italy was the first round of the WTCC after its return in 2005. It was held at Autodromo Nazionale di Monza between 2005 and 2008 before switching to the Autodromo Enzo e Dino Ferrari in Imola for 2009 in order to avoid clashing with the Formula One calendar. A round of the WTCC had already been held at Imola twice, firstly in 2005 when it was known as the 2005 FIA WTCC Race of San Marino and then in 2008 as the 2008 FIA WTCC Race of Europe. In December 2009 it was confirmed Monza would return to host the Italian round of the WTCC, where it has continued to be run since. When the provisional 2014 calendar was released in November 2013, Italy had been dropped from the schedule having hosted a race in every season of the championship since it began in 2005.

Gabriele Tarquini is the only driver to have won his home race, having won race two of the 2008 Race of Italy and race one of the 2009 Race of Italy.

Winners

References

External links

Italy
Italy
Race of Italy
2005 establishments in Italy